In mathematics, a Loeb space is a type of measure space introduced by  using nonstandard analysis.

Construction

Loeb's construction starts with a finitely additive map  from an internal algebra  of sets to the nonstandard reals. Even if  is a nonstandard -algebra, the algebra  need not be an ordinary -algebra as it is not usually closed under countable unions.

References

External links

Home page of Peter Loeb

Measure theory
Nonstandard analysis